Emil Joseph Planeta (January 31, 1909 – February 2, 1963) was a pitcher in Major League Baseball. He played for the New York Giants.

References

External links

1909 births
1963 deaths
Major League Baseball pitchers
New York Giants (NL) players
Baseball players from Connecticut
People from Haddam, Connecticut